The Ninth Gate is a 1999 neo-noir horror thriller film directed, produced, and co-written by Roman Polanski. An international co-production between the United States, Portugal, France, and Spain, the film is loosely based upon Arturo Pérez-Reverte's 1993 novel The Club Dumas. The plot involves authenticating a rare and ancient book that purportedly contains a magical secret for summoning the Devil.

The premiere showing was at San Sebastián, Spain, on 25 August 1999, a month before the 47th San Sebastian International Film Festival. Though critically and commercially unsuccessful in North America, where reviewers compared it unfavorably with Polanski's supernatural film Rosemary's Baby (1968), The Ninth Gate earned a worldwide gross of $58.4 million against a $38 million budget.

Plot
Dean Corso, a New York City rare book dealer, is hired by wealthy collector Boris Balkan. Balkan has acquired a copy of The Nine Gates of the Kingdom of Shadows, a book by 17th-century author Aristide Torchia said to be able to summon the Devil. Torchia is alleged to have written the book in collaboration with the Devil, and only three copies survived when he and his works were burned for heresy. Balkan believes only one of the three is authentic and wants Corso to inspect the other two to determine which one. During his travels, Corso comes into contact with a mysterious woman ("The Girl") who appears to be following him.

Corso interviews Liana Telfer, the widow of Andrew Telfer who sold Balkan The Nine Gates shortly before killing himself. Telfer later seduces Corso, hoping he will sell the book to her. After they have sex, and he refuses to sell, she attacks him, and knocks him unconscious. The next day, Corso goes to a bookseller he had entrusted the book to and finds him hanged in his store like an engraving in The Nine Gates. Corso retrieves the book and travels to Toledo, Spain, to speak to the Ceniza Brothers, book restorers who owned Balkan's copy before the Telfers. The two show him that, of the book's nine engravings, only six are signed "A.T."; the other three are signed "L.C.F." for Lucifer.

Corso travels to Sintra, Lisbon, Portugal, and meets with Victor Fargas who owns a copy of The Nine Gates. Corso finds that three different engravings in his copy are signed "L.C.F.", and the engravings signed this way have subtle differences from those signed "A.T." Corso relays his findings to Balkan and Balkan orders him to acquire Fargas' copy. The next day the Girl takes Corso to see Fargas, who has been drowned; Corso retrieves Fargas's burnt copy from the fireplace and finds the three "L.C.F." engravings torn out. Corso goes to Paris, France, to investigate the third copy owned by Baroness Kessler. Wary of Corso and knowing he is employed by Balkan, she refuses him. Corso is attacked while walking outside only to be saved by The Girl who exhibits seemingly supernatural powers. Corso hides Balkan's book in his hotel room and tells Kessler about the "L.C.F." engravings, proposing that each copy has three that together make an authentic set of nine. Intrigued, Kessler allows Corso to look at her copy. Corso is attacked, and the Baroness is strangled to death and her library set on fire. Corso returns to his hotel and discovers Balkan's copy is missing, probably stolen by Liana.

The Girl and Corso track Liana to a manor where a Satanic cult are conducting a ritual using Balkan's book. Balkan interrupts the ceremony, takes his copy back, and strangles Liana to death. Corso abandons the Girl, presuming she was working for Balkan, and pursues Balkan but loses him. Corso finds a clue in Kessler's belongings that directs him to a remote castle, where Balkan is preparing to summon the Devil using the nine "L.C.F." engravings. He subdues Corso and forces him to watch as he performs the ritual; it apparently works and grants Balkan power and immunity to harm, and he immolates himself to demonstrate. However, the ritual did not work and Balkan begins to scream in pain. Corso retrieves the engravings and shoots Balkan. Entering Balkan's car, Corso is confronted by the Girl. The two have sex on the ground, the Girl astride Corso and backlit by the castle, now engulfed in flames. Her face appears to change as she grinds on top of Corso.

The Girl explains Balkan's ritual did not work because one of the engravings was forged. When they stop for gas she leaves, but gives Corso a note sending him to the Ceniza brothers. At their shop, Corso finds they have mysteriously vanished and the shop is being cleaned out. As workmen remove a large bookcase, a dust-covered paper floats down from the top. This is the authentic engraving, which depicts a woman who resembles the Girl riding atop a dragon-like beast in front of the burning castle. Corso appears returning to the castle with the gates opening up full of bright blinding light, implying the entrance of the Ninth Gate has opened for him.

Cast

Production

Roman Polanski read the screenplay by Enrique Urbizu, an adaptation of the Spanish novel El Club Dumas (The Club Dumas, 1993), by Arturo Pérez-Reverte. Impressed with the script, Polanski read the novel, liking it because he "saw so many elements that seemed good for a movie. It was suspenseful, funny, and there were a great number of secondary characters that are tremendously cinematic". Pérez-Reverte's novel, El Club Dumas features intertwined plots, so Polanski wrote his own adaptation with his usual partner, John Brownjohn (Tess, Pirates and Bitter Moon). They deleted the novel's literary references and a sub-plot about Dean Corso's investigation of an original manuscript of a chapter of The Three Musketeers, and concentrated upon Corso's pursuing the authentic copy of The Nine Gates.

Polanski approached the subject skeptically, saying, "I don't believe in the occult. I don't believe. Period." Yet he enjoyed the genre. "There [are] a great number of clichés of this type in The Ninth Gate, which I tried to turn around a bit. You can make them appear serious on the surface, but you cannot help but laugh at them." The appeal of the film was that it featured "a mystery in which a book is the leading character" and its engravings "are also essential clues".

In reading El Club Dumas, Polanski pictured Johnny Depp as "Dean Corso", who joined the production as early as 1997, when he met Polanski at the Cannes Film Festival, while promoting The Brave. Initially, he did not think Depp right as "Corso", because the character was forty years old (Depp at the time was only 34). He considered an older actor, but Depp persisted; he wanted to work with Roman Polanski.

The film press reported, around the time of the North American release of The Ninth Gate, creative friction between Depp and Polanski. Depp said, "It's the director's job to push, to provoke things out of an actor". Polanski said of Depp, "He decided to play it rather flat, which wasn't how I envisioned it; and I didn't tell him it wasn't how I saw it". Visually, in the neo-noir genre style, rare-book dealer Dean Corso's disheveled grooming derives from Philip Marlowe, Raymond Chandler's quintessential literary private investigator.

Polanski cast Frank Langella as Boris Balkan based upon his performance as Clare Quilty in Lolita (1997). Barbara Jefford was a last-minute replacement for the German actress originally cast as the Baroness Frieda Kessler, who fell sick with pneumonia, and after a second actress proved unable to learn the character's dialogue; with only days' notice, Jefford learned her part, spoken with a German accent. Depp met his long-time partner Vanessa Paradis during the shooting.

Filming
The Ninth Gate was filmed in France, Portugal, and Spain in the summer of 1998. Selected prominent buildings in the film are:
 Chalet Biester, Sintra, Portugal (as mansion of book collector Victor Fargas)
 Château de Ferrières, Seine-et-Marne, France (as mansion owned by Liana Telfer)
 Château de Puivert, Aude, France (castle seen in the closing scenes of the film)
 Calle Buzones in Toledo, Spain (street with Ceniza Brothers' bookshop)

Soundtrack

The musical score for The Ninth Gate was composed by Wojciech Kilar, who previously collaborated with Polanski on Death and the Maiden (1994). The film's main theme is loosely based upon Havanaise, for violin and orchestra, by Camille Saint-Saëns; some of the score has a vocalization (specifically, a melodic aria) by Korean soprano Sumi Jo. A soundtrack album was released on 16 November 1999 via Silva Screen label.

Release and reception

Box office 
The premiere screening of The Ninth Gate was in San Sebastián, Spain, on 25 August 1999; in North America, it appeared in 1,586 cinemas during the 10 March 2000 weekend, earning a gross income of $6.6 million, and $18.6 million in total. Worldwide, it earned $58.4 million against a $38 million production budget.
On May 22, 2007, an extended version was released with a runtime of 2 hours and 13 minutes

Critical response 
On Rotten Tomatoes the film has an approval rating of 43% based on reviews from 94 critics, with an average rating of 5/10. The consensus reads, "Even though the film is stylish and atmospheric, critics say The Ninth Gate meanders aimlessly and is often ludicrous. And despite the advertising, there's hardly any chills." On Metacritic it has a score of 44 out of 100 based on reviews from 30 critics, indicating "mixed or average reviews". Audiences surveyed by CinemaScore gave the film a grade "D−" on scale of A to F.

Roger Ebert said the ending was lackluster, "while at the end, I didn't yearn for spectacular special effects, I did wish for spectacular information — something awesome, not just a fade-to-white". In his review for The New York Times, Elvis Mitchell said the movie was "about as scary as a sock-puppet re-enactment of The Blair Witch Project, and not nearly as funny". Entertainment Weekly rated the film "D+", and Lisa Schwarzbaum said it had an "aroma of middle-brow, art-house Euro-rot, a whiff of decay and hauteur in a film not even a star as foxed, and foxy, as Johnny Depp, himself, could save". In the Los Angeles Times, Kenneth Turan said the film was "too laid-back, and unconcerned about the pacing of its story to be satisfying", because "a thriller that's not high-powered, is an intriguing concept, in reality it can hold our attention for only so long". In the Village Voice, J. Hoberman said the film was "barely releasable hokum, stuffed with cheesy blah-blah". European reviews were generally more attentive and praised the film's pace and irony.

In Sight and Sound magazine, Phillip Strick said it was "not particularly liked at first outing — partly because Johnny Depp, in fake grey temples, personifies the odious Corso of the book a little too accurately — the film is intricately well-made, deserves a second chance, despite its disintegrations, and, in time, will undoubtedly acquire its own coven of heretical fans".

In Time magazine, Richard Corliss said that The Ninth Gate was Polanski's most accessible effort "since fleeing the U.S. soon after Chinatown".

In the San Francisco Chronicle, Bob Graham said that "Depp is the best reason to see Polanski's satanic thriller" and "Polanski's sly sense of film-noir conventions pokes fun at the genre, while, at the same time, honoring it".

After the release of The Ninth Gate, Artisan sued Polanski for taking more than $1 million from the budget, refunds of France's value-added tax that he did not give to the completion bond company guaranteeing Artisan Entertainment a completed film.

References

External links
 
 
 Texts, engravings and formatting of the book - Original
 
 "Satanic Verses" article from American Cinematographer magazine

1999 films
1990s mystery thriller films
1990s psychological thriller films
1990s supernatural thriller films
French mystery thriller films
Spanish mystery thriller films
Spanish thriller films
1990s French-language films
Latin-language films
Portuguese-language films
1990s Spanish-language films
Fictional gates
Films about bibliophilia
Films based on Spanish novels
Films based on thriller novels
Films based on works by Arturo Pérez-Reverte
Films set in France
Films set in New York City
Films set in Paris
Films set in Portugal
Films set in Spain
Films shot in France
Films shot in Portugal
Films shot in Spain
Films about books
Artisan Entertainment films
Films directed by Roman Polanski
Films produced by Roman Polanski
Films scored by Wojciech Kilar
Films with screenplays by Roman Polanski
English-language French films
French psychological thriller films
Films shot in the province of Toledo
1990s English-language films
1990s French films
1990s Spanish films
Films set in Toledo, Spain
French neo-noir films
Spanish neo-noir films